The American Booksellers Association (ABA) is a non-profit trade association founded in 1900 that promotes independent bookstores in the United States. ABA's core members are key participants in their communities' local economy and culture, and to assist them ABA creates relevant programs; provides education, information, business products, and services; and engages in public policy and industry advocacy. The Association actively supports and defends free speech and the First Amendment rights of all Americans, without contradiction of equity and inclusion, through the American Booksellers Foundation for Free Expression. A volunteer board of 10 booksellers governs the Association. ABA is headquartered in White Plains, New York.

Membership
The ABA's membership has varied over time:
1991 — 5,200 members
1995 — 5,500 members with 7000 stores
1998 — 3,300 members 
2000 — 3,100 members with 4000 stores
2001 — 2,794 members
2002 — 2,191 members 
2005 — 1,702 members, "more than 90" member bookstores opened
2006 — 97 member bookstores opened
2007 — 115 member bookstores opened
2008 — ABA published no data
2009 — 1,401 members with 1,651 stores, 40 member bookstores opened, 26 of which were listed by Google Maps as "permanently closed" in December 2018.
2010 — 1,410 members, first increase in almost two decades. 26 member bookstores opened, 14 of which were listed as "permanently closed" on Google Maps as of December 2018.
2011 — 1,512 members with stores in 1823 locations, 41 member bookstores opened,  Used bookstores are now eligible for membership, annual dues of smaller stores are lowered.
2012 — 1,567 members with stores in 1,900 locations, 43 member bookstores opened, 17 of which were listed as "permanently closed" on Google Maps in December 2018.
2013 — 1,632 members with stores in 1,971 locations, 45 member bookstores opened, 16 of which were listed as "permanently closed" on Google Maps in December 2018.
2014 — 1,664 members with stores in 2,094 locations, 59 member bookstores opened, 15 of which were no longer members and listed as "permanently closed" on Google Maps in December 2018.
2015 — 1,712 members with stores in 2,227 locations, 61 member bookstores opened, 14 of which were listed as "permanently closed" on Google Maps in December 2018, 3 others are marked "online only" in ABA's list.
2016 — 87 member bookstores opened 
2017 — 75 member bookstores opened
2018 — 1,835 members with stores in 2,470 locations, 99 member bookstores opened
2019 — 1,887 members with stores in 2,524 locations, 111 member bookstores opened
2020 — no numbers published
2021 — 1,700 members with stores in 2,100 locations

The ABA sponsored the Book Sense marketing program and associated BookSense.com web site, intended to preserve a connection between consumers and local independent bookstores. In June 2008, Book Sense was replaced by IndieBound, a new program and website.

Association of Booksellers for Children
In November, 2010, the Association of Booksellers for Children (ABC), a non-profit trade association supporting the business of independent children's bookselling, agreed to merge with the American Booksellers Association. The former ABC is now a membership group within the ABA.

See also
List of independent bookstores
Murder at the ABA, a novel by Isaac Asimov
List of booksellers associations
 Books in the United States

References

External links
 official website
 IndieBound.org website
 A program created and sponsored by ABA the Book and Author Luncheon, can be heard at The WNYC Archives. It ran from 1938 to 1974. (See also the Book and Author Luncheon.)

Independent bookstores of the United States
Independent bookstores of Canada
Trade associations based in the United States
Organizations established in 1900
American booksellers
Bookselling trade associations
1900 establishments in the United States